Garlock (formerly, Eugeneville) is an unincorporated community in Kern County, California.

A post office operated at Garlock from 1896 to 1904 and from 1923 to 1926.

Roberta Ruth  lived in Garlock in the 1960s, managing a curio shop.

Garlock is a ghost town that was known as El Paso City or Cow Wells interchangeably. The little town provided water for cattlemen and freighters wishing to avoid the potentially treacherous washes in Red Rock Canyon. Some gold had been found in the canyons of the El Paso Mountains, enough to warrant an arrastra being built in 1887. In 1893 a nugget was brought in worth $1,900 from Goler Heights and so the rush began. In 1894 Eugene Garlock of Tehachapi moved in an eight stamp mill. Miners would talk of going down to "the Garlock mill," "down to the Garlock," and finally just "Garlock."

Three miles to the southwest was the site of Old Garlock.

California Historical Landmark

The site is now registered as California Historical Landmark #671, designated on December 1, 1958. the marker is 74 mi W of State Hwy 395 on Garlock Rd, 13.4 mi NE of Cantil post office.

The California Historical Landmark reads: 
NO. 671 SITE OF THE TOWN OF GARLOCK - In 1896, Eugene Garlock constructed a stamp mill near this spot to crush gold ore from the Yellow Aster Mine on Rand Mountain. Known originally as Cow Wells by prospectors and freighters during the 1880s and early 1890s, the town of Garlock continued to thrive until 1898, when water was piped from here to Randsburg and the Kramer-Randsburg rail line was completed.

See also
 California Historical Landmarks in Kern County
California Historical Landmark

References

External links
 Ghosttowns.com photo gallery

See also

 List of California Historical Landmarks
 List of ghost towns in California

History of Kern County, California
Former settlements in Kern County, California
Mining communities in California
Unincorporated communities in California
California Historical Landmarks
Ghost towns in California
Populated places in the Mojave Desert